Sant'Agnese - Annibaliano is an underground station on Line B of the Rome Metro. It opened on 13 June 2012 as part of the Line B1 four station extension from Bologna to Conca d'Oro. It takes its name from the nearby church of Sant'Agnese fuori le mura and from the square under which the station is located, Piazza Annibaliano.

References

External links

Rome Metro Line B stations
Railway stations opened in 2012
2012 establishments in Italy
Rome Q. XVII Trieste
Railway stations in Italy opened in the 21st century